"@@@@@" is a DJ mix released as a single by Venezuelan record producer Arca. The mix premiered on NTS Radio on 19 February 2020. It was officially released on 21 February 2020 via XL Recordings.

Background and release
On 18 February 2020, Arca announced she would be premiering new music alongside posting a cryptic video to her social media accounts. The mix premiered at 6pm GMT on NTS Radio. Shortly after, a visual directed by Frederik Heyman accompanying all 62 minutes of the mix was uploaded to Arca's YouTube channel. Tour dates were also announced the same day. "@@@@@" was officially released on 21 February 2020 and a tracklist was also revealed via Arca's social media. In an accompanying statement, Arca said that the track is "a transmission broadcasted into this world from a speculative fictional universe in which the fundamentally analogue format of FM pirate radio remains one of few means to escape authoritarian surveillance powered by a hostage sentience gestated by a post-singularity AI." The single was mastered by Enyang Urbiks in Berlin.

Track listing
All tracks written and produced by Alejandra Ghersi. Tracklist adapted from YouTube.

References

2020 singles
Songs written by Arca (musician)
DJ mix albums